The Blytheville, Leachville and Arkansas Southern Railroad Depot-Leachville is a historic railroad station at the junction of 2nd and McNamee Streets in Leachville, Arkansas.  It is a single-story wood-frame structure, with an asphalt roof and wide overhanging eaves.   The telegrapher's station is in a small projection on the track side of the building.  The station, which provided both passenger and freight service, was built in 1910 by the Blytheville, Leachville and Arkansas Southern Railroad, a small regional railroad seeking to provide additional means for area farmers to bring their products to a wider market.

The station was listed on the National Register of Historic Places in 1992.

See also
National Register of Historic Places listings in Mississippi County, Arkansas

References

Railway stations on the National Register of Historic Places in Arkansas
Railway stations in the United States opened in 1910
National Register of Historic Places in Mississippi County, Arkansas
Leachville
Former railway stations in Arkansas
Transportation in Mississippi County, Arkansas
1910 establishments in Arkansas